Gerardus Gijsbertus Siderius (11 March 1914, Amsterdam – 14 April 1990, Loosdrecht) was a Dutch canoeist who competed in the 1936 Summer Olympics.
In 1936 he and his partner Henk Starreveld finished fifth in the K-2 10000 metres competition.

References

1914 births
1990 deaths
Canoeists at the 1936 Summer Olympics
Dutch male canoeists
Olympic canoeists of the Netherlands
Sportspeople from Amsterdam
20th-century Dutch people